James Thomas Jinks (19 August 1916 – 1981) was an English footballer who played as a centre forward in the Football League. He played from 1938 to 1952 for Millwall, Fulham, Luton Town and Aldershot. Whilst a Millwall player he also appeared as a guest player for West Ham United in World War II.

Jimmy moved to Kent League Ashford Town in 1952.

References

1916 births
1981 deaths
English footballers
Footballers from Camberwell
Association football forwards
Aldershot F.C. players
Fulham F.C. players
Luton Town F.C. players
Millwall F.C. players
English Football League players
West Ham United F.C. wartime guest players
Ashford United F.C. players
Kent Football League (1894–1959) players